Cleto and the Cletones is the moniker of the "house band" on the ABC-TV late-night television program, Jimmy Kimmel Live! (2003–present).

Overview
Cleto Escobedo III is the leader of the sextet, and plays the alto, tenor, and soprano saxophones on the show, as well as occasionally singing both on camera and off (for comedy bits and other musical segments). He grew up as a neighbor of host Jimmy Kimmel in Las Vegas and after briefly attending UNLV, he joined the band Santa Fe (now Santa Fe and The Fat City Horns).

Escobedo's big break came when Paula Abdul invited him to perform with her on tour.  Since that time, Escobedo has been based in Los Angeles, and performed on many commercial jingles and also toured with Marc Anthony and Earth, Wind & Fire’s Phillip Bailey.

His father, Cleto Escobedo, Jr., also plays tenor and alto saxophones on the show, and has an illustrious past as saxophonist with the groundbreaking late 1960s rock & soul band Los Blues. The band had close ties with The Righteous Brothers, and recorded one album at Chess Records that is out of print. Los Blues counted Sammy Davis, Jr. and Elvis Presley as fans. Escobedo, Jr. had hung up his horn until Kimmel called him to join his house band.

Other members of the Cletones are keyboardist Jeff Babko, guitarist Toshi Yanagi, bassist Jimmy Earl, and drummer Jonathan Dresel.

Collaborations
Cleto Escobedo III, Cleto Escobedo, Jr. and Jeff Babko made a guest appearance on Lazlo Bane's album Guilty Pleasures.

Discography
Los Blues Volume One Cleto The Cletones Jimmy Kimmel LP

References

Musical groups from Los Angeles
Radio and television house bands